In dermatologic pathology, a dermal cylindroma, also dermal eccrine cylindroma or cutaneous cylindroma) and (less specifically) cylindroma, is a benign adnexal tumor that occurs on the scalp and forehead.

Multiple cylindromas may grow together in a "hat-like" configuration, sometimes referred to as a turban tumor. Cylindromas are uncommon dysplasias of skin appendages.

Histology
Dermal cylindromas are: 
Dermal lesions consisting of nests of cells that are surrounded by hyaline (i.e., glassy, eosinophilic, acellular) material and have:
Hyperchromatic nuclei that may palisade (columnar nuclei arranged around the periphery of the cell nests with their short axis tangential to the nest periphery), and 
Cells with lighter staining ovoid nuclei at their centre.

They lack of a significant number of lymphocytes; this differentiates them from spiradenomas.

Additional images

See also 
 Spiradenoma
 Malignant acrospiroma

References

External links 

Epidermal nevi, neoplasms, and cysts